Puchheim (Central Bavarian: Buachham) is a town near Munich in the district of Fürstenfeldbruck, in Bavaria, Germany. It has about 20,000 inhabitants.

Puchheim is divided into two parts: the old and rural part called Puchheim-Ort and the new part of Puchheim (Puchheim-Bahnhof) that was founded when the Munich S-Bahn was built. Before that there was one of the first civil airfields in Bavaria, which was later used as a prisoner of war camp during World War I. The area around the camp was dried up by workers from the POW camp, so that houses could be built.

The old part of Puchheim is even older than Munich.

Transport
Puchheim is well connected to the regional and national traffic network by S-Bahn  (S4) and Autobahn (A 8, A 99).

Twin towns – sister cities

Puchheim is twinned with:
 Attnang-Puchheim, Austria
 Nagykanizsa, Hungary
 Salo, Finland
 Zalakaros, Hungary

References

Fürstenfeldbruck (district)